Roxburghe House is a specialist palliative care unit which is situated near Foresterhill, Aberdeen, Scotland. It is managed by NHS Grampian.

History
Roxburghe House was established as a hospice and palliative care facility within the grounds of Tor-na-Dee Hospital site at Milltimber in Aberdeen in 1977. Princess Diana visited Roxburghe House in March 1985 and a day care unit was added in 1990.

It moved to a purpose-built facility located to the east of the Foresterhill health campus in 2004. In September 2012 an extended garden area, which provides a peaceful and private area for patients and families, was unveiled.

Services
The facility has a multi-disciplinary team approach to providing care for patients. The team has three consultants, several specialist nurses and a team of trained and untrained nurses. Other professionals involved in the team include occupational therapists, physiotherapists, pharmacists, chaplains, and social workers.

Friends of Roxburghe 
The unit has a charity attached to it, the Friends Of Roxburghe, who help out with teas, coffees, reception duties, and flowers. The Friends of Roxburghe House have been awarded the Queen's Award for Voluntary Service.

References

External links 
 Friends of Roxburghe House website

NHS Grampian
Hospices in Scotland
Health in Aberdeen
NHS Scotland hospitals
Charities based in Aberdeen